Jumhuriyat is a thrice weekly newspaper published in Tajikistan. It is one of the most widely circulated papers in the country.

History and profile
The paper was established in 1925. The headquarters is in Dushanbe. It is owned by the Presidency of Tajikistan. It is written in the Tajik language.

References

1925 establishments in the Soviet Union
Communist newspapers
Mass media in Dushanbe
Newspapers published in Tajikistan
Publications established in 1925
State media